Douglas William MacAuley (July 22, 1929 – September 2, 2009) was a Canadian ice hockey player with the Edmonton Mercurys. He won a gold medal at the 1950 World Ice Hockey Championships in London, England. The 1950 Edmonton Mercurys team was inducted to the Alberta Sports Hall of Fame in 2011. He later played with the Spokane Flyers, Seattle Bombers, Victoria Cougars, Los Angeles Blades, and Portland Buckaroos.

References

1929 births
2009 deaths
Canadian ice hockey right wingers
Ice hockey people from Alberta
Los Angeles Blades (WHL) players
Portland Buckaroos players
People from Drumheller
Seattle Bombers players